Claude Faraggi (28 May 1942 – 14 December 1991) was a French writer best known for his 1975 novel, Le Maître d'heure, which won the Prix Femina.

Works
 1965: Les Dieux du sable
 1967: Le Jour du fou
 1969: L'Effroi
 1971: Le Signe de la bête, (awarded Fénéon Prize, 1972)
 1975: Le Maître d'heure, (awarded Prix Femina)
 1992: L'Eau et les Cendres
 1992: Le Passage de l'ombre
 1992: Les Feux et les Présages
 1992: La Saison des oracles

References

Writers from Clermont-Ferrand
1942 births
1991 deaths
Prix Femina winners
20th-century French novelists
French male novelists
Prix Fénéon winners
20th-century French male writers